Gilley Law or otherwise known as Lakeside Village is a neighbourhood in Sunderland, England.

Geography
Gilley Law is situated to the Southwest of Sunderland City Centre and is bordered by Farringdon, New Silksworth and Doxford Park. The stream Hendon Burn runs directly through the suburb and goes underneath the housing area.

Etymology
The term Gilley is derived from the old Norse term Gill (ravine) which refers to a form of valley or ravine, whilst "Law" refers to a hill. This makes the literal name of the suburb "Hill Valley".

References

City of Sunderland suburbs
Sunderland